The history and foundation of the MCZ

Methodism was founded by John and Charles Wesley in the 1730s in Britain. The duo were Anglican Priests; John was an evangelist and Charles a musician. This is the church John Wesley played a significant role in until the LORD took him to eternal rest in 1791. His parting words on his death bed were, “the best of all is, God is with us.” This statement became the motto for all Wesleyans.

Wesley preached to both North American and European continents. During and after his death, Methodism started to expand to Africa, Asia, Europe, North and Central America. In Africa the first port of call was West Africa, Sierra Leone in 1811. In 1816, the Missionaries landed in Cape Town, South Africa. Through these inroads, Methodism started to spread to most parts of Africa such as Gambia in 1820, Gold Cost in 1839, Nigeria in 1842 and Zimbabwe in 1891.

The first Missionaries to evangelize in Zimbabwe came under the umbrella of the London Missionary Society (L. M. S.), who then established a mission at Inyathi in Matebeleland North in 1859. On the other hand, the first Methodist Missionaries to Zimbabwe were Reverend Owen Watkins and Isaac Shimmin who arrived at Fort Salisbury from the Methodist Missionary Society (M. M. S.) in Britain on the 29th of September 1891.

The two ministers were accompanied by the Teaching- Evangelists from Southern Africa who were going to make evangelism easier by preaching to the fellow Native Africans. The Teaching Evangelists were of importance to spread the Good News to fellow Africans and without them, their work would have been a complete failure. Rev Isaac Shimmin confirms that “the more I see the natives, the more do I rejoice at the possibility before us; the evangelization of Africa could best be done by Africans witnessing to fellow Africans.”

African teacher- evangelists volunteered to join the Pioneer Column of 1891 because it had a band of missionaries. These Africans were people who offered themselves from Transvaal and CapeColony for the mission. Among them were: Michael Bowen, George Eva, Josiah Ramushu, Modumedi Moleli, Samuel Tutani, Wellington H Belisa and James Anta among others.

They established missions, in Fort Salisbury (Harare), Kwenda and   Epworth in 1891, Nenguwo (now Waddilove Institute) in 1897, Sandringham, Moleli, Pakame and Thekwane. Thekwane became the biggest centre in Matabeleland South while Waddilove was also the main centre in Mashonaland. Most of these institutions became the biggest centres of education where most of the old and new political guard, industry and commerce as well as the business elite of this country received their education.  Around 1915, infrastructural development of Nenguwo institution which later became Waddilove Institution was done.

During the same period, there was an influx of missionary groups into this country from other denominations at the encouragement of Cecil John Rhodes. The Methodist Church in Zimbabwe (the then Rhodesia) opened its doors to the first built church in 1893 in Bulawayo on the 13th of October, and this was a wood and iron structure, which was eventually dismantled and rebuilt at Steadfast Park Campsite in the Matopos area.

In the year 1895, the Rhodesia District was separated from the Transvaal hence the beginning of The Methodist Church in Zimbabwe as an independent District of the British Conference.  In 1965, a Zimbabwean leader Revd Andrew Ndhlela was appointed to lead the home District. Rev Ndhlela then ushered a new era right up to 1977 when on the 18th of October of this same year, he became the first black President of The Methodist Church in Zimbabwe after having been accorded autonomy from the mother church in Britain. In 2007, Methodists from all around the country celebrated 30 years of Autonomy and 300 years of Music at Kadoma Show grounds.

From 1997, The Methodist Church in Zimbabwe was now a fully-fledged conference that would run its own affairs.  More mission work was done in within, which today sees over 250 full-time ministers and a Methodist community of close to 200 000 members.  To date the church has excelled in the matters of education with 12 High schools and two boarding schools. In health, Waddilove Institution had been training nurses before it was turned into a high school. The Church has some clinics dotted around the country and a full time Health and Social Services person who ran these health institutions.   The church has been and still is a very powerful and essential player in the area of Human Rights, Christian and Social Responsibility. In view of this, the Church runs a social welfare orphanage, Matthew Rusike Children’s Homes situated in Epworth, Gweru and Mzinyati.

The MCZ has not looked back in the propagation of the gospel hence the establishment of a full-time Evangelism Officer. The church has a holistic approach to witnessing in this country and this is envisaged in the establishment of relevant departments such as the Tertiary Institutions Campus Ministry which is responsible for The MCZ Ministry on Campus, Research and Publications Department which holds the publishing and stationary roles and supply for the church the outside world, The Youth and Children’s Ministry to minister, support and care for the Young people from all cultures and backgrounds. The Projects Office to run all the profit making projects and Church farms that belong to the Church. A relief agency, the Methodist Development and Relief Agency (MeDRA) and a Farms department.

For over 120 years, The Methodist Church in Zimbabwe has not split and is found in all regions, tribes, provinces, ethnic groups, languages and cultures from Zambezi to Limpopo. Wherever you go, the Wesleyan tradition has remained as one.

Secondly, the Church exists under one leadership chosen after every three years by the Main Conference which the decision is making body of the church. We are as we are because God is and so our fellow founding fathers were, we also will be.

LEADERSHIP: High School is a Methodist High School in Marondera, Zimbabwe, established in 1891 by Methodist Missionary John White. The name Waddilove was in honour of Sir Joshua K Waddilove, an Englishman, philanthropist and founder of Provident Financial, who bequeathed 1,000 English pounds which resulted in the construction of two dormitory complexes for boys and girls. The school transformed from a Mission Station to Teacher Training College. The school is situated close to Muti Usinazita. Some of the past headmasters are Mr B.T Chakanyuka, Mr Gwanzura, Mr Munongi, Mr Murefu, Mr Moyo, and Mr Manhera.

Several Waddilove alumni were included as ministers in the first cabinet of the independent Zimbabwe in 1980:

 Stanlake Samkange
 Sydney Sekeramayi
 Herbert Ushewokunze
 Eddison Zvobgo

See also 

 List of secondary schools in Mashonaland East

References
Educational institutions established in 1891
High schools in Zimbabwe
1891 establishments in the British Empire
Marondera
Education in Mashonaland East Province